Andrea Pinamonti (born 19 May 1999) is an Italian professional footballer who plays as a forward for  club Sassuolo, on loan from Inter Milan. He also represents the Italy national team.

Club career

Inter Milan
Pinamonti made his senior debut for Inter Milan on 8 December 2016, aged 17, against Sparta Prague in the last match of 2016–17 UEFA Europa League group stage. Pinamonti was selected as a starter by coach Stefano Pioli and delivered a well-received performance, helping Inter to finish their European campaign with a 2–1 win. On 12 February 2017, Pinamonti made his first appearance in Serie A, with Inter winning the match 2–0 against Empoli at San Siro. Pinamonti latter dubbed his debut as "indescribable". In the 2016–17 season Pinamonti also won the Primavera title with the U19 youth team.

In the 2017–18 season, Pinamonti became a member of the first team but continued to play with Internzionale's U19 team in the UEFA Youth League. He made his season's first appearance on 12 December 2017, playing as a starter in the Coppa Italia match against Serie C club Pordenone.

Frosinone (loan)
On 17 August 2018, Pinamonti joined Serie A club Frosinone on loan until 30 June 2019. He scored his first goal in Serie A with Frosinone on 28 October in the match versus S.P.A.L.

Genoa
On 30 June 2019, Pinamonti joined Genoa on loan with an obligation to buy. On 18 September 2020, his contract was bought back by Inter Milan.

Loan to Empoli
On 25 August 2021, Pinamonti joined Empoli on a season-long loan.

Sassuolo
On 11 August 2022, Pinamonti joined Sassuolo on loan with an obligation to buy for a reported fee of €20 million, with a subsequent contract valid until June 2027.

International career
Pinamonti was selected in the Italy U17 team for the 2016 UEFA European Under-17 Championship, a tournament in which he scored one goal.

With the Italy U19 team, Pinamonti took part in the 2018 UEFA European Under-19 Championship, losing the final 4–3 after extra time against Portugal.

Pinamonti captained the Italy U20 side at the 2019 FIFA U-20 World Cup, scoring four goals in six matches and helping the team to reach the semi-finals of the tournament.

In June 2019, Pinamonti was also called up for the 2019 UEFA European Under-21 Championship but was forced to withdraw to a knee injury which occurred during the U-20 World Cup.

Pinamonti made his debut with the Italy U21 team on 6 September 2019, captaining the side in a 4–0 friendly match victory against Moldova.

Pinamonti made his senior team debut on 16 November 2022, in a 3–1 friendly win against Albania.

Personal life
Pinamonti is a lifelong Inter fan and has cited Mauro Icardi as his favourite player and role model.

Career statistics

Club

International

Honours
Inter Milan
Serie A: 2020–21

Italy U19
UEFA European Under-19 Championship runner-up: 2018

Italy U20
FIFA U-20 World Cup fourth place: 2019

References

External links
 Andrea Pinamonti at Inter.it
 
 Andrea Pinamonti at TBPlayers

Living people
1999 births
Italian footballers
Association football forwards
Italy under-21 international footballers
Italy youth international footballers
Inter Milan players
Frosinone Calcio players
Genoa C.F.C. players
Empoli F.C. players
U.S. Sassuolo Calcio players
Serie A players
People from Cles
Sportspeople from Trentino
Footballers from Trentino-Alto Adige/Südtirol